St. Canice's Hospital was a psychiatric hospital in Kilkenny, County Kilkenny, Ireland.

History
The hospital, which was designed by George Papworth in the Elizabethan style, opened as the Kilkenny Asylum in 1852. It became Kilkenny Mental Hospital in the 1920s and went on to become St. Canice's Hospital in the 1950s. After the introduction of deinstitutionalisation in the late 1980s the hospital went into a period of decline and closed in July 2006. A modern facility, St Gabriel's Ward, has been created in the grounds of the old hospital.

References

Hospitals in County Kilkenny
Canices
Hospital buildings completed in 1852
1852 establishments in Ireland
Hospitals established in 1852
Defunct hospitals in the Republic of Ireland
Hospitals disestablished in 2006
2006 disestablishments in Ireland